Olga Leonidovna Lerman (born 25 March 1988) is a Russian stage and film actress. She appeared in more than 20 films since 2009.

Biography

Early life 
Lerman was born in Baku, Azerbaijan Soviet Socialist Republic, Soviet Union (now Azerbaijan).

Selected filmography

Film

Television

References

External links 
 
 Olga Lerman on kino-teatr.ru

1988 births
Living people
Actors from Baku
21st-century Russian actresses
Russian film actresses
Russian television actresses
Russian stage actresses
Recipients of the Medal of the Order "For Merit to the Fatherland" II class